KPCO-FM (89.9 FM) is a radio station licensed to serve the community of Cooper, Texas. The station is owned by Iglesia Cristiana Ebenezer, and airs a Spanish religious format.

The station was assigned the KPCO-FM call letters by the Federal Communications Commission on May 11, 2011.

References

External links
 Official Website
 
 FCC Public Inspection File for KPCO-FM

Radio stations established in 2011
2011 establishments in Texas
PCO-FM
Delta County, Texas
PCO-FM